The Wyoming Cavalry were an American professional indoor football team based in Casper, Wyoming. They were most recently members of the Intense Conference in the Indoor Football League (IFL). The Cavalry began play in 2000 as an expansion member of the original Indoor Football League as the Casper Cavalry. The Cavalry became a charter member of the National Indoor Football League (NIFL) in 2001 following the original IFL's purchase by the Arena Football League's Orlando Predators. The move in 2001 also brought a franchise name change to the current Wyoming Cavalry. The team then joined the American Indoor Football Association (AIFA) in 2008 after the NIFL's demise. With the AIFA's presence in the Western United States dwindling, the Cavalry joined the IFL in 2011. In September, 2014, majority owner Mitch Zimmerman announced that the team would cease operations.

The Cavalry played their home games at the Casper Events Center.

History

The team began play in 2000 as an expansion member of the original Indoor Football League as the Casper Cavalry. Despite a successful inaugural season, they fell in the playoffs to the Black Hills Machine. When the original IFL folded, the Cavalry moved to the newly formed National Indoor Football League as the "Wyoming Cavalry" and became a charter member. The team also saw front office changes, as they were purchased by a local ownership group, headed by Mike Argeri Layton. The team was decently successful, making the playoffs in four of their seven overall seasons, as well as making it to the inaugural Indoor Bowl, losing to the Mississippi Fire Dogs. On July 14, 2007, Wyoming was scheduled to play an Indoor Football Championship of sorts against the Fayetteville Guard. Both franchises received letters on July 7, 2007, telling them they have been kicked out of the National Indoor Football League.

On August 18, 2007, the Cavalry officially announced they would join the American Indoor Football Association as a flagship team of the league's new Western Division. On July 26, 2009, the Cavalry hosted the Reading Express in AIFA Bowl III and were defeated 65–42. On July 25, 2010, the Cavalry traveled to Baltimore to take on the Mariners in AIFA Bowl IV and would go on to lose 57–42. As of the end of the 2010 season, the Cavalry are 0–5 in championship games.

On September 1, 2010, the Cavalry announced they would be joining the Indoor Football League as an expansion member for the 2011 season.

For the 2013 season, its third in the IFL, the Cavalry hired rookie head coach Ryan Lingenfelder to replace longtime head coach Dan "Majic" Maciejczak. Lingenfelder, a former AFL player, served as defensive coordinator of the Tri-Cities Fever for the previous three seasons. Shortly before the 2013 season began, the owner of the Cheyenne Warriors died and the IFL revised its schedule to accommodate the now 9-team league. The Cavalry had been scheduled to play two games against the projected in-state rival. Barney O'Donnell III joined the team as the new starting quarterback. After compiling a 2–24 record in 2 seasons, Lingenfelder was relieved of his coaching duties.

Season-by-season 

|-
| colspan="6" align="center" | Casper Cavalry (IFL)
|-
|2000 || 9 || 5 || 0 || 3rd WC Northern || Lost Round 1 (Black Hills)
|-
| colspan="6" align="center" | Wyoming Cavalry (NIFL)
|-
|2001 || 8 || 6 || 0 || 2nd Pacific Central || Won Round 1 (Utah) Won Round 2 (Sioux Falls)Lost Indoor Bowl I (Mississippi)
|-
|2002 || 3 || 11 || 0 || 5th Pacific West || --
|-
|2003 || 4 || 10 || 0 || 6th Pacific West || --
|-
|2004 || 5 || 9 || 0 || 3rd Pacific West || --
|-
|2005 || 10 || 4 || 0 || 2nd Pacific West || Lost Round 1 (Tri-Cities)
|-
|2006 || 8 || 6 || 0 || 2nd Pacific West || Lost Round 1 (Tri-Cities)
|-
|2007 || 7 || 1 || 0 || 1st Pacific || Lost Budweiser Indoor Football Championship Bowl (Fayetteville)
|-
| colspan="6" align="center" | Wyoming Cavalry (AIFA)
|-
|2008 || 11 || 3 || 0 || 1st WC West ||Won WCW Round 1 (Arizona)Won Divisional (Mississippi)Lost AIFA Championship Bowl II (Florence)
|-
|2009 || 12 || 2 || 0 || 1st West || Won Divisional (Utah Valley)Lost AIFA Championship Bowl III (Reading)
|-
|2010 || 13 || 1 || 0 || 1st West || Won Divisional (San Jose)Lost AIFA Championship Bowl IV (Baltimore)
|-
| colspan="6" align="center" | Wyoming Cavalry (IFL)
|-
|2011 || 9 || 5 || 0 || 2nd Mountain West || Lost Round 1 (Allen)
|-
|2012 || 4 || 10 || 0 || 7th Intense ||
|-
|2013 || 1 || 13 || 0 ||4th Intense  || --
|-
|2014 || 1 || 13 || 0 || 4th Intense  || --
|-
!Totals || 105 || 109 || 0
|colspan="2"| (including playoffs)

Notable players

Final roster

Awards and honors
The following is a list of all Cavalry players who have won league Awards

All-IFL players
The following Cavalry players have been named to All-IFL Teams:
 WR Jasonus Tillary (1), Troy Evans (1), Samuel Charles (1)
 K Travis Atter (1)

Head coaches
Note: Statistics are correct through the end of the 2014 Indoor Football League season.

References

External links
 Official website
  The NIFL schedule page taken May 13, 2007.
 Cavalry's 2008 Stats
 Cavalry's 2009 Stats
 Cavalry's 2010 Stats

 
2001 establishments in Wyoming
2014 disestablishments in Wyoming